In mathematics, the natural numbers are those numbers used for counting (as in "there are six coins on the table") and ordering (as in "this is the third largest city in the country"). 
Numbers used for counting are called cardinal numbers, and numbers used for ordering are called ordinal numbers. Natural numbers are sometimes used as labels, known as nominal numbers, having none of the properties of numbers in a mathematical sense (e.g. sports jersey numbers).

The natural numbers form a set. This chain of extensions canonically embeds the natural numbers in the other number systems.

Properties of the natural numbers, such as divisibility and the distribution of prime numbers, are studied in number theory. Problems concerning counting and ordering, such as partitioning and enumerations, are studied in combinatorics.

In common language, particularly in primary school education, natural numbers may be called counting numbers to intuitively exclude the negative integers and zero, and also to contrast the discreteness of counting to the continuity of measurement—a hallmark characteristic of real numbers.

History

Ancient roots

The most primitive method of representing a natural number is to put down a mark for each object. Later, a set of objects could be tested for equality, excess or shortage—by striking out a mark and removing an object from the set.

The first major advance in abstraction was the use of numerals to represent numbers. This allowed systems to be developed for recording large numbers. The ancient Egyptians developed a powerful system of numerals with distinct hieroglyphs for 1, 10, and all powers of 10 up to over 1 million. A stone carving from Karnak, dating back from around 1500 BCE and now at the Louvre in Paris, depicts 276 as 2 hundreds, 7 tens, and 6 ones; and similarly for the number 4,622. The Babylonians had a place-value system based essentially on the numerals for 1 and 10, using base sixty, so that the symbol for sixty was the same as the symbol for one—its value being determined from context.

A much later advance was the development of the idea that  can be considered as a number, with its own numeral. The use of a 0 digit in place-value notation (within other numbers) dates back as early as 700 BCE by the Babylonians, who omitted such a digit when it would have been the last symbol in the number. The use of a numeral 0 in modern times originated with the Indian mathematician Brahmagupta in 628 CE. However, 0 had been used as a number in the medieval computus (the calculation of the date of Easter), beginning with Dionysius Exiguus in 525 CE, without being denoted by a numeral. Standard Roman numerals do not have a symbol for 0; instead, nulla (or the genitive form nullae) from nullus, the Latin word for "none", was employed to denote a 0 value.

The first systematic study of numbers as abstractions is usually credited to the Greek philosophers Pythagoras and Archimedes. Some Greek mathematicians treated the number 1 differently than larger numbers, sometimes even not as a number at all. Euclid, for example, defined a unit first and then a number as a multitude of units, thus by his definition, a unit is not a number and there are no unique numbers (e.g., any two units from indefinitely many units is a 2).

Independent studies on numbers also occurred at around the same time in India, China, and Mesoamerica.

Modern definitions
In 19th century Europe, there was mathematical and philosophical discussion about the exact nature of the natural numbers. Henri Poincaré stated that axioms can only be demonstrated in their finite application, and concluded that it is "the power of the mind" which allows conceiving of the indefinite repetition of the same act. Leopold Kronecker summarized his belief as "God made the integers, all else is the work of man".

The constructivists saw a need to improve upon the logical rigor in the foundations of mathematics. In the 1860s, Hermann Grassmann suggested a recursive definition for natural numbers, thus stating they were not really natural—but a consequence of definitions. Later, two classes of such formal definitions were constructed; later still, they were shown to be equivalent in most practical applications.

Set-theoretical definitions of natural numbers were initiated by Frege. He initially defined a natural number as the class of all sets that are in one-to-one correspondence with a particular set. However, this definition turned out to lead to paradoxes, including Russell's paradox. To avoid such paradoxes, the formalism was modified so that a natural number is defined as a particular set, and any set that can be put into one-to-one correspondence with that set is said to have that number of elements.

The second class of definitions was introduced by Charles Sanders Peirce, refined by Richard Dedekind, and further explored by Giuseppe Peano; this approach is now called Peano arithmetic. It is based on an axiomatization of the properties of ordinal numbers: each natural number has a successor and every non-zero natural number has a unique predecessor. Peano arithmetic is equiconsistent with several weak systems of set theory. One such system is ZFC with the axiom of infinity replaced by its negation. Theorems that can be proved in ZFC but cannot be proved using the Peano Axioms include Goodstein's theorem.

With all these definitions, it is convenient to include 0 (corresponding to the empty set) as a natural number. Including 0 is now the common convention among set theorists and logicians. Other mathematicians also include 0, and computer languages often start from zero when enumerating items like loop counters and string- or array-elements. On the other hand, many mathematicians have kept the older tradition to take 1 to be the first natural number.

Notation
The set of all natural numbers is standardly denoted  or  Older texts have occasionally employed  as the symbol for this set.

Since natural numbers may contain  or not, it may be important to know which version is referred to. This is often specified by the context, but may also be done by using a subscript or a superscript in the notation, such as:
 Naturals without zero: 
 Naturals with zero: 

Alternatively, since the natural numbers naturally form a subset of the integers (often  they may be referred to as the positive, or the non-negative integers, respectively. To be unambiguous about whether 0 is included or not, sometimes a subscript (or superscript) "0" is added in the former case, and a superscript "" is added in the latter case:

Properties

Addition
Then  is a commutative monoid with identity element 0. It is a free monoid on one generator. This commutative monoid satisfies the cancellation property, so it can be embedded in a group. The smallest group containing the natural numbers is the integers.

Multiplication
This turns  into a free commutative monoid with identity element 1; a generator set for this monoid is the set of prime numbers.

Relationship between addition and multiplication
Addition and multiplication are compatible, which is expressed in the distribution law: . These properties of addition and multiplication make the natural numbers an instance of a commutative semiring. Semirings are an algebraic generalization of the natural numbers where multiplication is not necessarily commutative. The lack of additive inverses, which is equivalent to the fact that  is not closed under subtraction (that is, subtracting one natural from another does not always result in another natural), means that  is not a ring; instead it is a semiring (also known as a rig).

Furthermore,  has no identity element.

Order
In this section, juxtaposed variables such as  indicate the product , and the standard order of operations is assumed.

A total order on the natural numbers is defined by letting  if and only if there exists another natural number  where .

An important property of the natural numbers is that they are well-ordered: every non-empty set of natural numbers has a least element.

Division
In this section, juxtaposed variables such as  indicate the product , and the standard order of operations is assumed.

This Euclidean division is key to the several other properties (divisibility), algorithms (such as the Euclidean algorithm), and ideas in number theory.

Algebraic properties satisfied by the natural numbers
The addition (+) and multiplication (×) operations on natural numbers as defined above have several algebraic properties:
 If the natural numbers are taken as "excluding 0", and "starting at 1", then for every natural number , . However, the "existence of additive identity element" property is not satisfied
 If the natural numbers are taken as "excluding 0", and "starting at 1", the "no nonzero zero divisors" property is not satisfied.

Generalizations
Two important generalizations of natural numbers arise from the two uses of counting and ordering: cardinal numbers and ordinal numbers.
 A natural number can be used to express the size of a finite set; more precisely, a cardinal number is a measure for the size of a set, which is even suitable for infinite sets. This concept of "size" relies on maps between sets, such that two sets have the same size, exactly if there exists a bijection between them. The set of natural numbers itself, and any bijective image of it, is said to be countably infinite and to have cardinality aleph-null.
 Natural numbers are also used as linguistic ordinal numbers: "first", "second", "third", and so forth. This way they can be assigned to the elements of a totally ordered finite set, and also to the elements of any well-ordered countably infinite set. This assignment can be generalized to general well-orderings with a cardinality beyond countability, to yield the ordinal numbers. An ordinal number may also be used to describe the notion of "size" for a well-ordered set, in a sense different from cardinality: if there is an order isomorphism (more than a bijection!) between two well-ordered sets, they have the same ordinal number.

For finite well-ordered sets, there is a one-to-one correspondence between ordinal and cardinal numbers; therefore they can both be expressed by the same natural number, the number of elements of the set. This number can also be used to describe the position of an element in a larger finite, or an infinite, sequence.

A countable non-standard model of arithmetic satisfying the Peano Arithmetic (that is, the first-order Peano axioms) was developed by Skolem in 1933. The hypernatural numbers are an uncountable model that can be constructed from the ordinary natural numbers via the ultrapower construction.

Georges Reeb used to claim provocatively that "The naïve integers don't fill up" . Other generalizations are discussed in the article on numbers.

Formal definitions

There are two standard methods for formally defining natural numbers. The first one, due to Giuseppe Peano, consists of an autonomous axiomatic theory called Peano arithmetic, based on few axioms called Peano axioms.

The second definition is based on set theory. It defines the natural numbers as specific sets.

The sets used to define natural numbers satisfy Peano axioms. It follows that every theorem that can be stated and proved in Peano arithmetic can also be proved in set theory. However, the two definitions are not equivalent, as there are theorems that can be stated in terms of Peano arithmetic and proved in set theory, which are not provable inside Peano arithmetic. A probable example is Fermat's Last Theorem.

The definition of the integers as sets satisfying Peano axioms provide a model of Peano arithmetic inside set theory. An important consequence is that, if set theory is consistent (as it is usually guessed), then Peano arithmetic is consistent. In other words, if a contradiction could be proved in Peano arithmetic, then set theory would by contradictory, and every theorem of set theory would be both true and wrong.

Peano axioms

The five Peano axioms are the following:

 0 is a natural number.
 Every natural number has a successor which is also a natural number.
 0 is not the successor of any natural number.
 The axiom of induction: If a statement is true of 0, and if the truth of that statement for a number implies its truth for the successor of that number, then the statement is true for every natural number.

These are not the original axioms published by Peano, but are named in his honor. Some forms of the Peano axioms have 1 in place of 0.

Set-theoretic definition

Intuitively, the natural number  is the common property of all sets that have  elements. So, it seems natural to define  as an equivalence class under the relation "can be made in one to one correspondence". Unfortunately, this does not work in set theory, as such an equivalence class would not be a set (because of Russell's paradox). The standard solution is to define a particular set with  elements that will be called the natural number .

The following definition was first published by John von Neumann, although Levy attributes the idea to unpublished work of Zermelo in 1916. As this definition extends to infinite set as a definition of ordinal number, the sets considered below are sometimes called von Neumann ordinals.

The definition proceeds as follows:
 Call , the empty set.
 By the axiom of infinity, there exist sets which contain 0 and are closed under the successor function. Such sets are said to be inductive. The intersection of all inductive sets is still an inductive set.
 This intersection is the set of the natural numbers.

It follows that the natural numbers are defined iteratively as follows:
,
,
,
,
, 
 etc.

It can be checked that the natural numbers satisfies the Peano axioms.

In other words, the set inclusion defines the usual total order on the natural numbers. This order is a well-order.

It follows from the definition that each natural number is equal to the set of all natural numbers less than it. This definition, can be extended to the von Neumann definition of ordinals for defining all ordinal numbers, including the infinite ones: "each ordinal is the well-ordered set of all smaller ordinals."

If one does not accept the axiom of infinity, the natural numbers may not form a set. Nevertheless, the natural numbers can still be individually defined as above, and they still satisfy the Peano axioms.

There are other set theoretical constructions.

With this definition each natural number is a singleton set. So, the property of the natural numbers to represent cardinalities is not directly accessible; only the ordinal property (being the th element of a sequence) is immediate. Unlike von Neumann's construction, the Zermelo ordinals do not extend to infinite ordinals.

See also

 
 
 Sequence – Function of the natural numbers in another set

Notes

References

Bibliography

 
 
 
 
 
 
 
 
 
 
 
 
 
 
 
 
 
 
 

External links

 
 

Cardinal numbers
Elementary mathematics
Integers
Number theory
Sets of real numbers